Black Mountain, also known as Mount Day, is a mountain in the Diablo Range of eastern Santa Clara County, California, east of Poverty Ridge and Arroyo Hondo, and about  from Milpitas.

The peak is one of the highest in area. The northern half of Black Mountain is an oak woodlands while the southern half is barren. Black Mountain can be clearly seen from most parts of the Santa Clara Valley including Sunnyvale, Cupertino, Mountain View and San Jose. The peak is visible from the Mount Hamilton and Monument Peak.

See also 
 List of summits of the San Francisco Bay Area

References

External links
 
 

Mountains of Santa Clara County, California
Diablo Range
Milpitas, California
Mountains of the San Francisco Bay Area
Mountains of Northern California